Geoffrey Barnard (born 23 March 1946) is an English former professional footballer who played as a goalkeeper.

Career
Born in Southend, Barnard played for Norwich City, Scunthorpe United and Scarborough.

References

1946 births
Living people
English footballers
Norwich City F.C. players
Scunthorpe United F.C. players
Scarborough F.C. players
English Football League players
Association football goalkeepers